Islamabad Tonight is a current affairs program from Islamabad, Pakistan, hosted by Nadeem Malik. Islamabad Tonight was launched in December 2008, in which issues related to Pakistan have been discussed like security, terrorism, economy and politics. This daily program is one of the prime time talk shows of AAJ TV and goes on air from Monday to Friday at 8 p.m.

In August 2009, Islamabad Tonight presented a special interview with Pakistan's nuclear scientist Dr. Abdul Qadeer Khan, where he detailed his role in the nuclear field, development of Pakistan's nuclear power and how he interacted with Iran, North Korea and other countries.

The programs on war on terror and security issues of Pakistan included interviews of former Director General ISI Lt. Gen. (R) Hamid Gul, Clifford D. May, Brig (R) Mian Mahmood, Seymour Hersh. On religious issues, Malik interviewed Dr. Israr Ahmed, Mufti Taqi Usmani, Justice Khalil-ur-Rehman. On civil-military relations in Pakistan, he interviewed Admiral (R) Fasih Bokhari, Gen. Moinuddin Haider and Javed Jabbar, Lt. Gen. Shahid Aziz and programmes with former Army Chief General Mirza Aslam Baig, former Director General ISI Gen. (R) Asad Durrani.

References

External links
 Pakistani Scientis Cites Help to Iran
 Islamabad Tonight - Pakistan Reporter
 AAJ TV official website

Pakistani television series
Mass media in Islamabad